Basilica of St. Martin may refer to:

 Basilica of Saint Martin, Tours, a Roman Catholic basilica in Tours, France
 Basilica of Saint-Martin d'Ainay, a Romanesque church in Lyon, France
 Taal Basilica, the Minor Basilica of Saint Martin of Tours, in Batangas, Philippines
 Basilica of St. Martin, Bingen am Rhein, a Catholic church in Rhineland-Palatinate, Germany